The women's heavyweight (70 kg/154 lbs) Full-Contact category at the W.A.K.O. European Championships 2004 in Budva was the second heaviest of the female Full-Contact tournaments and involved just five fighters.  Each of the matches were three rounds of two minutes each and were fought under Full-Contact kickboxing rules.

As there were too few competitors for an eight-woman tournament, three of the fighters received a bye into the semi finals.  The tournament gold medallist was Julia Chernenko from Russia who defeated Karolina Lukasik from Poland by unanimous decision in the final.  Pierina Guerreri from Italy and Jelena Duric from hosts Serbia and Montenegro claimed bronze.

Results

Key

See also
List of WAKO Amateur European Championships
List of WAKO Amateur World Championships
List of female kickboxers

References

External links
 WAKO World Association of Kickboxing Organizations Official Site

W.A.K.O. European Championships 2004 (Budva)